Shitaye Alemu Balcha is an Ethiopian physician and academic, "a venerated local internist who pioneered diabetes care in northern Ethiopia". An expert in non-communicable diseases, she has published on diabetes, epilepsy and HIV/AIDS in rural Ethiopia. She is Professor of Internal Medicine in the College of Medicine and Health Sciences at the University of Gondar.

Life
Dr Shitaye Alemu began her teaching career in the University of Gondar in 1984. In January 2001 she became chair of the university's Anti-HIV/AIDS project. In May 2019 she was promoted to full professorship.

References

Year of birth missing (living people)
Living people
Ethiopian physicians
Academic staff of the University of Gondar